Beara GAA is a division of Cork GAA, and is responsible for organizing Gaelic Athletic Association games in the Beara Peninsula in County Cork, Ireland. It is one of eight divisions of Cork County Board. It organizes competitions for the clubs within the division, from Under 12 up to the adult level. The winners of these competitions compete against other divisional champions to determine which club is the county champion. Currently, the following clubs are part of the Beara division - Castletownbere, Adrigole, Urhan, Garnish, Bere Island and Glengarriff. It has no senior football team so the only representative in the Cork Senior Football Championship is the divisional team. The division also competes in the Cork Minor Football Championship and the Cork Under-21 Football Championship. Beara is a Gaelic football stronghold, with very little hurling played, and no competitions organized.

Member Clubs
 Adrigole
 Bere Island
 Castletownbere
 Garnish
 Glengarriff
 Urhan

History
The Beara division was formed in 1927 when the Cork County Board divided the county into 8 divisions.

Achievements
 Munster Senior Club Football Championship Winner (1) 1968
 Cork Senior Football Championship Winners (6) 1932, 1933, 1934, 1940, 1967, 1997 | Runners-Up 1939
 Cork Minor Football Championship Winners (4) 1988, 2003, 2009, 2021 | Runners-Up 1963, 1989, 1990
 Cork Under-21 Football Championship Winners (4) 1996, 1997, 1999, 2006  | Runners-Up 1975, 1977, 1979, 1980, 1990, 1991
 Cork Under 16 Football Championship Winners (2) 2008, 2009
 Cork Under 14 Football Championship Winners (1) 2014

Notable players
 Paddy Harrington
 Nealie Duggan
 Bernie O'Neill
 Mort O'Shea
 Joe O'Sullivan
 Kevin Jer O'Sullivan
 John Lack O'Sullivan

Beara Competitions
 Beara Junior A Football Championship
Beara Junior B Football Championship
Beara U21 Football Championship

Football

Grades

External sources
 Beara Sports News
 Adrigole GAA website

Gaelic games clubs in County Cork
Gaelic football clubs in County Cork